Isaac Teitei Nortey (born 1999) is a US-based Ghanaian tennis player. He was one of the highest-ranked junior tennis player in Africa at the age of 15.

Early life and education 
Nortey was born in Accra in Ghana. He is studying Human Development and Family Studies. He is based in the United States.

Career 
Nortey began his career as a soccer player before switching to tennis at the age of 7. He started playing at the Lakeland's Galindo Tennis. He won six tournaments. He has played in Intercollegiate Tennis Association tournament hosted in Mexico.

In June 2019 Nortey was part of the Ghanaian tennis team to take part in the Davis Cup Group IV in Brazzaville, Congo.

External links 
Isaac Nortey in Nevada.

References 

1999 births
Living people
Ghanaian tennis players
Ghanaian sportspeople